Oscar Muñoz (born 20 May 1949) is a Colombian footballer. He competed in the men's tournament at the 1968 Summer Olympics.

References

External links

1949 births
Living people
Colombian footballers
Colombia international footballers
Olympic footballers of Colombia
Footballers at the 1968 Summer Olympics
Footballers from Medellín
Association football defenders
Deportivo Cali footballers